Gyoides is a genus of harvestmen in the family Sclerosomatidae from Nepal.

Species
 Gyoides gandaki J. Martens, 1982
 Gyoides geometricus J. Martens, 1982
 Gyoides himaldispersus J. Martens, 1982
 Gyoides maximus J. Martens, 1982
 Gyoides rivorum J. Martens, 1982
 Gyoides tibiouncinatus J. Martens, 1982

References

Harvestmen
Harvestman genera